Hugh Baird (14 March 1930 – 19 June 2006) was a Scottish footballer, who played for Airdrieonians, Leeds United and Aberdeen. He also represented the Scotland national football team on one occasion against Austria at Hampden Park. Glasgow.

Baird started his professional playing career aged 21 with Scottish Football League side Airdrieonians, whom he joined from Dalry Thistle. A striker, he quickly gained a reputation as a prolific goal scorer. In 1957 Leeds United signed him for £12,000 but he only stayed one season in England. In 1958 Aberdeen paid a then club record transfer fee of £11,500 to ensure his return north. He stayed with Aberdeen until 1962 making 86 appearances for the Dons.

Baird continued playing football for another 5 years following his departure from Pittodrie, enjoying a very brief spell with Brechin City and not featuring in the Brechin first team, before moving into the Highland Football League for longer spells with Deveronvale FC, the Banff Highland League Club, followed by a three-year spell at Rothes FC on Speyside, Morayshire, before retiring from football, aged 36, to become a bricklayer. Both Highland League clubs were in convenient rail commuting distance from his home in Aberdeen where he had settled following his transfer from Leeds United, and where he lived with his family until his death in June 2006 at 76 years of age.

Baird made one appearance for the Scottish national side in May 1956 at Hampden Park against Austria. He only received an international cap in 2006, after a successful campaign was started by Gary Imlach calling for his father and other affected players (including Baird) to receive caps. Until the early 1970s, the SFA did not award caps to players for matches other than those in the British Home Championship.

References

External links
London Hearts profile

1930 births
2006 deaths
Aberdeen F.C. players
Airdrieonians F.C. (1878) players
Association football forwards
Brechin City F.C. players
Dalry Thistle F.C. players
Deveronvale F.C. players
Leeds United F.C. players
Rothes F.C. players
Scotland international footballers
Scottish Football League players
Scottish footballers
Footballers from Bellshill
English Football League players
Scottish league football top scorers
Scottish Junior Football Association players